The Sea, the Sea is a novel by Iris Murdoch. Published in 1978, it was her nineteenth novel. It won the 1978 Booker Prize.

Plot 

The Sea,   the Sea is a tale of the strange obsessions that haunt a self-satisfied playwright and director as he begins to write his memoirs. Murdoch's novel exposes the motivations that drive her characters – the vanity, jealousy, and lack of compassion behind the disguises they present to the world. Charles Arrowby, its central figure, decides to withdraw from the world and live in seclusion in a house by the sea.  While there, he encounters his first love, Mary Hartley Fitch, whom he has not seen since his love affair with her as an adolescent.  Although she is almost unrecognisable in old age, and outside his theatrical world, he becomes obsessed by her, idealising his former relationship with her and attempting to persuade her to elope with him.  His inability to recognise the egotism and selfishness of his own romantic ideals is at the heart of the novel.  After the farcical and abortive kidnapping of Mrs. Fitch by Arrowby, he is left to mull over her rejection in a self-obsessional and self-aggrandising manner over the space of several chapters. "How much, I see as I look back, I read into it all, reading my own dream text and not looking at the reality... Yes of course I was in love with my own youth... Who is one's first love?"

Title 

Iris Murdoch's biographer Peter J. Conradi gives Xenophon as the ultimate source of the title. According to Xenophon's Anabasis, "The Sea! The Sea!" (Thalatta! Thalatta!) was the shout of exultation given by the roaming 10,000 Greeks when, in 401 BC, they caught sight of the Black Sea from Mount Theches in Trebizond and realised they were saved from death. Conradi states that the direct source of the title is Paul Valéry's poem Le Cimetiere Marin (The Graveyard by the Sea). A line in the poem's first stanza quotes the Greeks' shouts: "La mer, la mer, toujours recommencėe" (The Sea, the sea, forever restarting). Murdoch refers to the poem in several of her books, and this stanza appears in full at the end of chapter 4 in her 1963 novel  The Unicorn.

Adaptations 

A four-part adaptation of The Sea, The Sea by Richard Crane, directed by Faynia Williams appeared as the Classic Serial on BBC Radio 3 in 1993. The actors included John Wood as Charles Arrowby, Joyce Redman as Hartley Fitch, with Siân Phillips, Sam Crane & Peter Kelly. Episode 3 included an interview with Iris Murdoch.

A two-part adaptation of The Sea, the Sea by Robin Brooks appeared on BBC Radio 4 in August 2015. The actors included Jeremy Irons as Charles Arrowby, Maggie Steed as Hartley Fitch, and  Simon Williams as James Arrowby.

Analysis

Awards 

The book won Murdoch the 1978 Booker Prize. In 2022, the novel was included on the "Big Jubilee Read" list of 70 books by Commonwealth authors, selected to celebrate the Platinum Jubilee of Elizabeth II.

Further reading 

 Wolfe, Graham. "Iris Murdoch and the Immoralities of Adaptation". Adaptation. 2022.

References

Booker Prize-winning works
1978 British novels
British philosophical novels
Novels by Iris Murdoch
Novels about writers
Chatto & Windus books